Colima Fútbol Club is a Mexican professional football team based in Colima City, Colima, Mexico currently playing in Liga Premier de México.

History 
In December 2019 Loros UdeC was dissolved after the death of its owner, which left Colima City without a professional football team.

At the beginning of 2020, Sergio Bueno, a football manager born in the city, began a project to return football to the city with the aim of getting a promotion to higher categories of the Mexican Football Federation. On March 12, 2020, the club's registration with the Mexican Football Federation was made official, which is why it is considered as the founding date of Colima F.C.  In June, an agreement was signed between the University of Colima and an association for the use of the Estadio Olímpico Universitario de Colima by a new football team.

On July 17, 2020, the team's participation in the Liga Premier de México was announced. On July 29 it was announced that the team will be part of Group 1 along with other teams from the northern and western areas of Mexico. On August 20, René Isidoro García was officially announced as the first coach in the club's history, the same day, it was announced that the club will seek to have a development area for youth footballers and a women's team.

On September 19, 2020, Colima F.C. played its first official match. The team defeated Gavilanes de Matamoros 2–0. Jorge Almaguer scored the first goal in the club's history.

Stadium 
The Estadio Olímpico Universitario de Colima is a multi-use stadium in Colima City, Colima, Mexico.  It is currently used mostly for football matches and is the home stadium for Colima Fútbol Club.  The stadium has a capacity of 11,812 people and opened in 1994.

Players

First-team squad

Managers 
  René Isidoro García (2020–2022)
  Ernesto Santana (2022)
  Usiel Andrade (2022–)

References

External links 
Liga MX profile

Football clubs in Colima
Association football clubs established in 2020
2020 establishments in Mexico
Liga Premier de México